Stangaland is a former municipality in Rogaland county, Norway. It was part of the traditional district of Haugaland. The municipality of Stangaland existed from 1909 until 1965 when it was merged into the newly created Karmøy Municipality. The  municipality encompassed the rural areas surrounding the coastal city of Kopervik on the island of Karmøy. The administrative centre was the village of Stangaland just outside the town of Kopervik.

History
The municipality called Kopervik herred was established on 1 January 1909 when it was split off from the municipality of Avaldsnes.  Initially, Kopervik had a population of 1,001.  The rural municipality surrounded the town of Kopervik which was a separate municipality. In 1917, the name of the municipality was changed to Stangaland to better distinguish the municipality from the neighboring town with the same name. During the 1960s, there were many municipal mergers across Norway due to the work of the Schei Committee. On 1 January 1965, Stangaland municipality was merged with the neighboring municipalities of Avaldsnes, Skudenes, Torvastad, and Åkra and with the towns of Kopervik and Skudeneshavn to form the new municipality of Karmøy. Prior to the merger, Stangaland had a population of 2,678.

Government
All municipalities in Norway, including Stangaland, are responsible for primary education (through 10th grade), outpatient health services, senior citizen services, unemployment and other social services, zoning, economic development, and municipal roads.  The municipality is governed by a municipal council of elected representatives, which in turn elects a mayor.

Municipal council
The municipal council  of Stangaland was made up of 17 representatives that were elected to four year terms.  The party breakdown of the final municipal council was as follows:

See also
List of former municipalities of Norway

References

Karmøy
Former municipalities of Norway
1909 establishments in Norway
1965 disestablishments in Norway